Abdulkarim Al Sulaiman (born 24 June 2000) is a Saudi Arabian professional footballer who plays as a centre-back for Pro League side Al-Tai.

Club career
Al Sulaiman started his career at Al-Tai. He was promoted to the first team during the 2019–20 season after the season resumed following the COVID-19 pandemic. In the 2020–21 season, Al Sulaiman was part of the squad that earned promotion to the Pro League for the first time since 2008. He made his Pro League debut on 27 November 2021 by starting the league match against Al-Ittihad.

References

External links
 

2000 births
Living people
Association football defenders
Saudi Arabian footballers
Saudi Arabia youth international footballers
Al-Tai FC players
Saudi First Division League players
Saudi Professional League players